Isshōmasu Site is an archaeological site that is located in Kamakura, Kanagawa Prefecture. The site was designated a National Historic Site of Japan in 2007. It is a Kamakura period earthworks beside the road, half a kilometre from Gokuraku-ji.

References

See also 

 List of Historic Sites of Japan (Kanagawa)

Kamakura, Kanagawa
History of Kanagawa Prefecture